Gridiron! is a football game by Bethesda Softworks.

Gameplay
Gridiron! is a game in which statistics for players are provided on an NFL DataDisc.

Reception

Wyatt Lee reviewed the game for Computer Gaming World, and stated that "Although this game is only available for the Amiga and Atari ST, the graphics are not as spectacular as one would expect for these machines."

Atari Explorer rated the game an 8 of 10.

John Harrington reviewed Gridiron! for Games International magazine, and gave it a rating of 8 out of 10, and stated that "I was dubious about the decision to combine strategy and arcade action but in Gridiron! it works."

The game sold well  and was awarded Sports game of the year, as well as voted as one of the 40 Best Games of All Time by Amiga World.  Bethesda founder Christopher Weaver said in 1994 that Gridiron "put us on the map"

References

1986 video games
American football video games
Amiga games
Atari ST games
Bethesda Softworks games
Video games developed in the United States
Video games set in the United States